is a Japanese politician who served as the Minister of Health, Labour, and Welfare from September 2020 to October 2021. He is also a member of the House of Representatives representing Mie's 4th district since 1996.

Early life and education
A native of Matsusaka, Mie, Tamura was born on 15 December 1964. He is a graduate of Chiba University's faculty of economics and law.

Career
Tamura started his career at the family-run construction company Nippon Doken Co. in Tsu, Mie, in 1987. Next, he began to work as a secretary of his uncle, Hajime Tamura, who served as a member of the House of Representatives and as Speaker.

Tamura was elected to the lower house for the first time in 1996, taking his uncle's seat. He has then served six consecutive terms as a representative. He became parliamentary secretary for health, labour and welfare in the Mori cabinet and then for education, culture, sports, science and technology in the cabinet of Junichiro Koizumi. He was appointed vice internal affairs minister in the first cabinet of Shinzo Abe in 2006. He headed the committee of health, labor and welfare in the lower house during the prime ministry of Taro Aso.

He served as Minister of Health, Labor and Welfare under Prime Minister Shinzo Abe from 2012 to 2014, and was again appointed for the role by Prime Minister Yoshihide Suga from September 2020 to October 2021.

References

External links

1964 births
Living people
Liberal Democratic Party (Japan) politicians
Members of the House of Representatives (Japan)
Politicians from Mie Prefecture
Government ministers of Japan
Ministers of Health, Labour and Welfare of Japan
Chiba University alumni
People from Matsusaka, Mie
21st-century Japanese politicians
Members of Nippon Kaigi